The J. Ross Robertson Cup is a Canadian ice hockey trophy. It is awarded annually in senior ice hockey to the champion of Allan Cup Hockey by the Ontario Hockey Association (OHA). It was donated by John Ross Robertson in 1899, and is the first of three similarly named trophies he established. His other eponymous trophies for the OHA include, the J. Ross Robertson Cup awarded to the annual champions of the junior division, and the J. Ross Robertson Cup which was formerly awarded to the annual champions of the intermediate division.

History

The J. Ross Robertson Cup was donated by John Ross Robertson on December 3, 1898, to be awarded annually to the champion of the senior ice hockey division in the Ontario Hockey Association (OHA). Robertson served as president of the OHA from 1899 to 1905, had founded the Toronto Evening Telegram, helped establish The Hospital for Sick Children, and served as a member of the House of Commons of Canada for Toronto East. He was against professionalism in sports. In his donation speech he said, that would help "our boys to be strong, vigorous and self-reliant", and that "sport should be pursued for its own sake, for when professionalism begins, true sport ends".

The cup was crafted by the Queen's silversmiths in London, and is made of sterling silver and lined with gold. The bowl is decorated with faces of lions and has three handles shaped as leopards. Each winning team receives its own shield on the plinth, with the player's names engraved on it. The J. Ross Robertson Cup replaced the Cosby Cup as of the 1898–99 season, and its first winner was Queen's University. The Toronto Granites who won the cup in 1922 and 1923, then won gold in ice hockey at the 1924 Winter Olympics.

The J. Ross Robertson Cup was the first of three similarly named trophies Robertson donated to the OHA, which included the J. Ross Robertson Cup for the annual champions of the junior division, and the J. Ross Robertson Cup for the annual champions of intermediate division.

List of cup winners
Championship trophy of:
 OHA Senior A League (1899 to 1979)
 OHA Senior Series (1980)
 OHA Senior A Hockey League (1981 to 1987)
 Allan Cup Hockey (2002 to present) 

List of cup winners:

References

1898 establishments in Ontario
Awards established in 1898
Canadian ice hockey trophies and awards
Ontario Hockey Association
Senior ice hockey